TRIPOS (TRIvial Portable Operating System) is a computer operating system. Development started in 1976 at the Computer Laboratory of Cambridge University and it was headed by Dr. Martin Richards. The first version appeared in January 1978 and it originally ran on a PDP-11. Later it was ported to the Computer Automation LSI4 and the Data General Nova. Work on a Motorola 68000 version started in 1981 at the University of Bath. MetaComCo acquired the rights to the 68000 version and continued development until TRIPOS was chosen by Commodore in March 1985 to form part of an operating system for their new Amiga computer; it was also used at Cambridge as part of the Cambridge Distributed Computing System.

Students in the Computer Science department at Cambridge affectionately refer to TRIPOS as the Terribly Reliable, Incredibly Portable Operating System. The name TRIPOS also refers to the Tripos system of undergraduate courses and examinations, which is unique to Cambridge University.

Influences on the Amiga computer 
In July 1985, the Amiga was introduced, incorporating TRIPOS in the AmigaDOS module of AmigaOS. AmigaDOS included a command line interface and the Amiga File System. The entire AmigaDOS module was originally written in BCPL (an ancestor of the C programming language), the same language used to write TRIPOS. AmigaDOS would later be rewritten in C from AmigaOS 2.x onwards, retaining backwards compatibility with 1.x up until AmigaOS 4 (completely rewritten in C) when AmigaDOS abandoned its BCPL legacy.

Features 
TRIPOS provided features such as pre-emptive multi-tasking (using strict-priority scheduling), a hierarchical file system and multiple command line interpreters.

The most important TRIPOS concepts have been the non-memory-management approach (meaning no checks are performed to stop programs from using unallocated memory) and message passing by means of passing pointers instead of copying message contents. Those two concepts together allowed for sending and receiving over 1250 packets per second on a 10 MHz Motorola 68010 CPU.

Most of TRIPOS was implemented in BCPL. The kernel and device drivers were implemented in assembly language.

One notable feature of TRIPOS/BCPL was its cultural use of shared libraries, untypical at the time, resulting in small and therefore fast loading utilities.  For example, many of the standard system utilities were well below 0.5 Kbytes in size, compared to a typical minimum of about 20 Kbytes for functionally equivalent code on a modern Unix or Linux.

TRIPOS was ported to a number of machines, including the Data General Nova 2, the Computer Automation LSI4, Motorola 68000 and Intel 8086- based hardware. It included support for the Cambridge Ring local area network. More recently, Martin Richards produced a port of TRIPOS to run under Linux, using Cintcode BCPL virtual machine.

As of February 2020, TRIPOS is still actively maintained by Open G I Ltd. (formerly Misys Financial Systems) in Worcestershire, UK. Many British insurance brokers have a Linux/Intel based TRIPOS system serving networked workstations over a TCP/IP connection - the systems are used to run Open G I's BROOMS Application suite. Open G I have added a number of features to support the modern office such as the ability to integrate into many mainstream applications and services such as SQL server, Citrix XENAPP, terminal servers, etc.

Commands 
The following list of commands is supported by the TRIPOS CLI.

 ALINK
 ASSEM
 ASSIGN
 BREAK
 C
 CD
 CONSOLE
 COPY
 DATE
 DELETE
 DIR
 DISKCOPY
 DISKDOCTOR
 ECHO
 ED
 EDIT
 ENDCLI
 FAILAT
 FAULT
 FILENOTE
 FORMAT
 IF
 INFO
 INSTALL
 JOIN
 LAB
 LIST
 MAKEDIR
 MOUNT
 NEWCLI
 PATH
 PROMPT
 PROTECT
 QUIT
 RELABEL
 RENAME
 RUN
 SEARCH
 SKIP
 SORT
 STACK
 STATUS
 TYPE
 VDU
 WAIT
 WHY

Cintpos 
Cintpos is an experimental interpretive version of TRIPOS which runs on the Cintcode BCPL virtual machine, also developed by Martin Richards.

References 

 Reference manuals
 Martin Richards' Cintpos page
 A brief informal history of the Computer Laboratory
 In the beginning was CAOS

Further reading

External links 

 Amiga history guide: TripOS/68k
 CBG Stallone Computer

Amiga
Computer-related introductions in 1978
Discontinued operating systems
History of computing in the United Kingdom
University of Cambridge Computer Laboratory